The plot of the Naruto manga series, written and illustrated by Masashi Kishimoto, is divided in to two; the second part is known as Part II. The series is about the eponymous character Naruto Uzumaki who wants recognition and respect from the fellow villagers, and to become the Hokage, the leader of Konohagakure. Part II, set two-and-a-half years after the conclusion of Part I, follows the return of the ninja Uzumaki to Konohagakure from two-and-a-half years of training. As he returns, he continues his goal of convincing his best friend Sasuke Uchiha to return with him and his other friends back to Konohagakure.

Naruto was published in individual chapters by Shueisha in Weekly Shōnen Jump and later collected in tankōbon format with extra content. The manga series was first published in issue 43 of 1999, with Part II beginning in issue 19 of 2005. Volume 49 was published on January 4, 2010, and the final volume, 72, was published on February 4, 2015.

The episodes began airing immediately after the end of the original Naruto anime, which had been showing filler episodes to widen the plot gap between the anime and the manga.

The English version (serialization) of the Naruto manga, licensed by Viz Media, is published in North America in the Weekly Shonen Jump digital magazine and was originally serialized in the defunct monthly Shonen Jump print magazine. English-language trade volumes are published digitally and in print on Viz Media's Viz Manga website. To compensate for occasional gaps between the manga's Japanese and English adaptations, Viz Media has periodically published several volumes in a short period of time. Volume 49 was published in English on October 5, 2010, and volume 72 on October 6, 2015. The third box set containing the volumes from the second half of Part II was released in the United States by Viz Media on January 5, 2016.



Volume list

References

External links
 Official Shueisha Naruto site 
 Official Viz Media Naruto site

Chapters (Part II)